Rock Art in the Ha'il Region is the fourth site in Saudi Arabia to be inscribed on the UNESCO List of World Heritage Sites. The rock art includes two components situated in the desert of the Ha'il Region: the first is Om Sinman mountain at the city of Jubbah, and the second is al-Manjor and Raat at Al-Shuwaymis. An ancient population left traces of their passings in petroglyphs on the rock's surface, holding 8,000 years of history.

The committee in its 39th session choose the site together with two different sites. Since this site has been added to the UNESCO World Heritage List, the Saudi Commission for Tourism has sought to further protect the cultural site. These efforts include increasing the buffer zone, repainting and refurnishing the petroglyphs, developing a monitoring system, and more.

Inscription criteria 
The rock art in the Hail Region was inscribed for some criteria. It involves numerous petroglyphs which were created using various methods with simple stone hammers. It also a significant witness of human struggles against the environmental catastrophes.

Gallery

References 

Ha'il Province
History of Saudi Arabia
World Heritage Sites in Saudi Arabia